Predrag Marković (born 7 December 1955) is a Serbian politician, author and historian.

Political career
Marković was President of the National Assembly of Serbia from 2004 to 2007 and the acting President of Serbia within Serbia and Montenegro between 4 March and 11 July 2004. In addition, he has been the president of the G17 Plus Management Board, the President of the G17 Plus Political Council and member of their Executive Board. In 2003, he was chosen as an honorary president of the G17 Plus Party.

During Marković's tenure as President of the National Assembly, the National Assembly unanimously returned the coat of arms, flag and anthem of Serbia on 17 August 2004 and on 5 June 2006 announced Serbia's sovereignty.

Marković was the Movement for the Restoration of the Kingdom of Serbia candidate for Mayor of Belgrade during the 2018 Belgrade City Assembly election. He finished with 4,291 votes.

Literary career
Marković is a member of PEN, the Serbian Literary Society and is the former president of the Association of Publishers of Serbia and Montenegro. From 1993 to 2013, he was the owner of the Stubovi kulture publishing house and has written six books. He speaks Serbian, Russian, and Spanish.

Marković is a contributor and honourable member of the Urban Book Circle (Canada).

Personal life
Marković is known for keeping details from his personal life private. On 26 December 2015, Marković married Vesna (née Vujatović; born 1991). He has a son from a previous marriage.

Published books
 L‘imun. Isceđen (1982)
 Morali bi doći nasmejani lavovi (1983)
 Otmenost duše (1989)
 Zavodnik ništavila (2017)
 Kovčeg komedijant (2018)
 David protiv Otužnog Zloduha (2020)

References

External links

1955 births
Living people
People from Paraćin
Serbian writers
Serbian monarchists
20th-century Serbian historians
Serbian book publishers (people)
Serbian literary critics
Government ministers of Serbia
G17 Plus politicians
Movement for the Restoration of the Kingdom of Serbia politicians
Presidents of the National Assembly (Serbia)
Presidents of Serbia within Yugoslavia
University of Belgrade Faculty of Political Science alumni